Broydo is a surname. Notable people with the surname include:

Grigory Broydo (1883–1956), Tajik Soviet politician
Kasriel Broydo (1907–1945), Lithuanian songwriter, singer, and coupletist